The Chief Minister of Saint Helena is the head of the Saint Helena Government. The chief minister is elected by the Legislative Council of Saint Helena, and is formally appointed by the Governor of Saint Helena, the representative of the British monarch.

The creation of the post was approved following the 2021 Saint Helena governance system referendum. The post of chief minister is the equivalent of a premier or prime minister in other British Overseas Territories.

The inaugural (and current) Chief Minister is Julie Thomas, who took office on 25 October 2021.

Chief ministers of Saint Helena (2021–present)

See also
List of current heads of government in the United Kingdom and dependencies
 List of leaders of dependent territories
 Politics of Saint Helena

References

External links
 ST HELENA CHOOSES MINISTERIAL SYSTEM
 Inaugural Meeting Of Legislative Council - Monday, 25 October 2021
 Inaugural Meeting of Legislative Council - Councillor Julie Thomas elected as Chief Minister

 
Politics of Saint Helena
Lists of heads of government
2021 establishments in Saint Helena and Dependencies